A constitutional institution, constitutional body or constitutional organ is a government institution created by a constitution. As these institutions derives its powers, duties and responsibilities directly from the constitution, which is harder to be amended by legislature compared to sub-constitutional laws, their status is rather more stable and independent than institutions created by sub-constitutional laws. 

Role of the constitutional institutions inside government reflects each constitution's national context and identity. For example, according to the German constitution, only five institutions are regarded as constitutional institutions in German federal government, reflecting classic structure for separation of powers; 'Bundesrat' and 'Bundestag' of German legislature, President and Cabinet of German executive, and Federal Constitutional Court of German judiciary.

However, modern constitution such as South African constitution creates various government institutions directly by itself, which has similar role as independent agency in classic government structure. This so called 'Chapter nine institutions' of South Africa are explained as constitutional attempt to guarantee accountability of government, yet there are also worries as these new 'constitutionally independent' agencies can create tensions inside separation of powers between traditional branches and institutions of South African government. These modern independent agencies created directly by constitution sometimes fails to achieve its expected role, as their level of institutional independence varies according to specific political situations.

Examples of constitutional institutions 
 Constitutional body (India)
 Constitutional institutions (Italy)
 Institutions of constitutional importance (Italy)
 Chapter nine institutions (South Africa)
 Constitutional organizations of Thailand

See also 
 Separation of Powers
 Independent agency

Notes and References 

Constitutions
Government agencies by type